Metzl is a surname. Notable people with this surname include:

Ervine Metzl (1899–1963), American graphic illustrator
Jamie Metzl (born  1968), American futurist
Jonathan Metzl (born 1964), American psychiatrist and author

See also
Metz (surname)